Charles Leslie Barrett (26 June 1879 – 16 January 1959) was an Australian naturalist, journalist, author and ornithologist.

Born in Hawthorn, Victoria, he was a foundation member of the Royal Australasian Ornithologists Union (RAOU) in 1901 and editor of its journal the Emu, 1910–1916. He also wrote for Walkabout. In 1953 he was awarded the Australian Natural History Medallion.

Charles Barrett also served in the AIF during the Great War.  He embarked from Melbourne in May 1917 as a member of a contingent of reinforcements for the Camel Field Ambulance Unit, and served in Egypt and Palestine.  His 1942 book, "On the Wallaby. Quest and adventure in many lands" contains an account and photographs of this mission.

His son Don moved to the Territory of Papua and New Guinea, where he served as a member of the Legislative Council and House of Assembly.

Bibliography
As well as many articles, he wrote or contributed to numerous popular books on natural history, as well as his own travels and experiences. Some of these are:
Barrett, Charles. (1907). From Range to Sea. A bird lover's ways. T.C. Lothian: Melbourne.
Barrett, Charles (1913) The Bush Ramblers. T. Shaw Fitchett, Melbourne.
Barrett, Charles (1915) The Isle of Palms. Lothian, Melbourne.
Barrett, Charles. (1919). In Australian Wilds. The gleanings of a naturalist. Melbourne Publishing Co: Melbourne.
Barrett, Charles (1922) Egyptian Hours. Whitehead Morris, Alexandria.
Barrett, Charles. (1923). Rambles Round the Zoo. Whitcombe & Tombs Ltd: Melbourne.
Manfield, Alice; introduction by Barrett, Charles, C.M.Z.S. (1924). The Lyre-Birds of Mount Buffalo. Robertson & Mullens: Melbourne
Barrett, Charles. (1924) Bushland Babies Cornstalk Publishing Company 1924
Barrett, Charles. (1931). The Weekly Times Wild Nature book. Herald and Weekly Times Ltd: Melbourne.
Barrett, Charles. (1937). Koala. The story of Australia's native bear. Robertson & Mullens: Melbourne.
Barrett, Charles. (1939). Koonwarra. A naturalist's adventures in Australia. Oxford University Press: London
Barrett, Charles. (1941). Australia: My Country. Oxford University Press: Melbourne.
Barrett, Charles. (1942). From a Bush Hut. Cassell & Co: Melbourne.
Barrett, Charles. (1942). On the Wallaby. Quest and adventure in many lands. Robertson & Mullens: Melbourne.
Barrett, Charles. (1943). Australian Wild Life. Georgian House: Melbourne.
Barrett, Charles. (1943). Kangaroo and his Kin. Robertson & Mullens: Melbourne.
Barrett, Charles. (1943). Up North. Australia above Capricorn. Robertson & Mullens: Melbourne.
Barrett, Charles. (1944). Australian Caves, Cliffs and Waterfalls. Georgian House: Melbourne.
Barrett, Charles. (1944). Australian Nature Wonders. Robertson & Mullens: Melbourne.
Barrett, Charles. (1944). The Platypus. The world's wonder animal. Robertson & Mullens: Melbourne.
Barrett, Charles. (1946). Coast of Adventure. Untamed north Australia. Robertson & Mullens: Melbourne.
Barrett, Charles. (1946). The Bunyip, and other Mythical Monsters and Legends. Reed & Harris: Melbourne.
Barrett, Charles. (1946). Wanderer's Rest. Cassell & Co: Melbourne.
Barrett, Charles. (1949). Parrots of Australasia. N.H. Seward: Melbourne.
Barrett, Charles. (1950). Reptiles of Australia. Cassell: Melbourne.
Barrett, Charles. (1954). Wild Life of Australia and New Guinea. William Heinemann Ltd: Melbourne.
Barrett, Charles; & Burns, Alex N. (1951). Butterflies of Australia and New Guinea. N.H. Seward: Melbourne.

References

Robin, Libby. (2001). The Flight of the Emu: a hundred years of Australian ornithology 1901-2001. Carlton, Vic. Melbourne University Press.

External links
 
 Bright Sparcs
 Australian War Memorial: First World War Embarkation Roll 

Australian ornithologists
Australian naturalists
Australian nature writers
Writers from Melbourne
1879 births
1959 deaths
Australian book and manuscript collectors
People from Hawthorn, Victoria
Australian military personnel of World War I
Military personnel from Melbourne